Moustier or Moustiers is the name or part of the name of several communes in France and Belgium:

Belgium
 Moustier, Hainaut, in Hainaut province
 Moustier-sur-Sambre, in Namur province

France 
 Moustier, Lot-et-Garonne, in the Lot-et-Garonne département
 Moustier-en-Fagne, in the Nord département
 Moustier-Ventadour, in the Corrèze département
 Peyzac-le-Moustier, in the Dordogne département
 Saint-Sever-du-Moustier, in the Aveyron département
 Moustiers-Sainte-Marie, also called Moustiers, in the Alpes-de-Haute-Provence département 
 Verneuil-Moustiers, in the Haute-Vienne département